The 1912 Chicago Cubs season was the 41st season of the Chicago Cubs franchise, the 37th in the National League and the 20th at West Side Park. The Cubs finished third in the National League with a record of 91–59. Third baseman Heinie Zimmerman led the circuit in home runs, batting average, and slugging percentage.

Regular season

Season standings

Record vs. opponents

Roster

Player stats

Batting

Starters by position 
Note: Pos = Position; G = Games played; AB = At bats; H = Hits; Avg. = Batting average; HR = Home runs; RBI = Runs batted in

(a) Baseball Reference and Retrosheet have his 1912 RBI total at 104.
Baseball Almanac and The Baseball Cube have his RBI total at 99.

Other batters 
Note: G = Games played; AB = At bats; H = Hits; Avg. = Batting average; HR = Home runs; RBI = Runs batted in

Pitching

Starting pitchers 
Note: G = Games pitched; IP = Innings pitched; W = Wins; L = Losses; ERA = Earned run average; SO = Strikeouts

Other pitchers 
Note: G = Games pitched; IP = Innings pitched; W = Wins; L = Losses; ERA = Earned run average; SO = Strikeouts

Relief pitchers 
Note: G = Games pitched; W = Wins; L = Losses; SV = Saves; ERA = Earned run average; SO = Strikeouts

Awards and honors

League top five finishers 
Larry Cheney
 #1 wins (26)

Johnny Evers
 #2 on-base percentage (.431)
 #4 batting average (.341)

Frank Schulte
 #2 home runs (12)

Heinie Zimmerman
 #1 batting average (.372)
 #1 home runs (14)
 #1 slugging percentage (.571)
 #3 runs batted in (99)
 #5 on-base percentage (.418)

External links
1912 Chicago Cubs season at Baseball Reference

Chicago Cubs seasons
Chicago Cubs season
Chicago Cubs